Zhang Yun may refer to:

 Zhang Yun (Han Dynasty), military general
 Zhang Yun (banker) (born 1959), Chinese economist and banker